The Brazilian monitor Bahia was originally ordered by Paraguay in 1864 with the name Minerva, but was sold to Brazil when Paraguay defaulted on the payments. She participated in the 1864–70 War of the Triple Alliance between Brazil, Argentina and Uruguay against Paraguay, and took part in the Passage of Humaitá.

Design and description
Bahia was an iron-hulled, single-turret river monitor. Bahia displaced  and was fitted with a ram bow. Her crew consisted of 125 officers and enlisted men. The ship had a pair of horizontal trunk steam engines, each driving one propeller, using steam from two boilers. She was barque-rigged with three pole masts and a bowsprit.

Bahia was armed with a pair of 120-pounder Whitworth rifled muzzle-loading guns.

Construction and service
Bahia, named after the eponymous Brazilian state, was originally ordered by Paraguay from the British shipbuilding firm of Laird Brothers and was laid down in 1864 with the name of Minerva and the yard number 326 at their Birkenhead shipyard. She was purchased by Brazil the following year, after the start of the war when Paraguay was cut off from the outside world and could no longer make payments. The ship was launched on 11 June 1865 and completed on 22 January 1866.  On 19 February 1868 together with five other Brazilian ironclad warships she took part in the Passage of Humaitá.

Bahia was refitted in 1887 during which her boilers were replaced and a bridge was added between the turret and the funnel.

Footnotes

References

External links
 Brief history of Bahia 

Ironclad warships of the Brazilian Navy
1865 ships
Minerva